Reon is a given name. Notable people with the name include:

 Reon Cuffy (born 1999), Dominican footballer
 Reon Kadena (born 1986), Japanese glamor model and actress
 Reon King (born 1975), Guyanese former cricketer
 Reon Moore (born 1993), Trinidadian footballer
 Reon Nozawa (born 2003), Japanese footballer
 Reon Yamahara (born 1999), Japanese footballer
 Reon Yuzuki (born 1979), Japanese actress
 Reon Kadena (born 1986), Japanese glamour model

Japanese unisex given names